Winston "Spree" Simon (1930 – 18 April 1976) was a Trinidadian inventor, pioneer and musician of the steelpan.

Life

Simon was born in Laventille, Trinidad. He is credited with the invention of the Ping Pong steelpan instrument.
Simon also was part of TASPO, the Trinidad All Steel Percussion Orchestra and visited Great Britain in 1951.

Winston "Spree" Simon worked closely with Anthony Williams, who later invented the fourth and fifth soprano pan. Simon also gave Bertie Marshall significant impulses for his work in developing harmonical tuning.

The American musician and composer Van Dyke Parks celebrated the life of Winston Simon in the song "Tribute to Spree" on his album Clang of the Yankee Reaper written and first recorded by the late great Lord Kitchener.

Further reading
 Felix I. R. Blake, The Trinidad and Tobago Steel Pan. History and Evolution. 
 Stephen Stuempfle, The Steelband Movement: The Forging of a National Art in Trinidad and Tobago, Philadelphia: University of Pennsylvania Press, 1995
 Cy Grant, Ring of Steel: Pan Sound and Symbol, Macmillan Caribbean, 1999,

See also
Steelpan
Ellie Mannette

Notes

External links
 http://www.nalis.gov.tt/Biography/history_PanPioneers_WinstonSimonEllieMannette.htm
 Terry Joseph, "Remembering 'Spree' Simon", TriniSoca.com, 18 April 2001

1930 births
1976 deaths
Steelpan musicians
Trinidad and Tobago musicians
Date of birth missing
Place of death missing